The 1934 United States Senate special election in Montana took place on November 6, 1934. Incumbent United States Senator John E. Erickson, who, as governor, had appointed himself to the seat in 1933 upon the death of Thomas J. Walsh, ran for re-election. However, he was defeated in the Democratic primary by James E. Murray, who was the former Silver Bow County Attorney and the Chairman of the State Advisory Board of the Public Works Administration. In the general election, Murray defeated Scott Leavitt, a former United States Congressman who had represented Montana's 2nd congressional district, and an independent candidate in a landslide to win his first term in the Senate.

Democratic primary

Candidates
James E. Murray, Chairman of the State Advisory Board of the Public Works Administration, former Silver Bow County Attorney
James F. O'Connor, former Speaker of the Montana House of Representatives
John E. Erickson, incumbent United States Senator
Louis P. Donovan
John A. Lovelace
W. W. Hamilton

Results

Republican primary

Candidates
Scott Leavitt, former United States Congressman from Montana's 2nd congressional district
Wellington D. Rankin, former United States Attorney for the District of Montana, former Attorney General of Montana
Leonard C. Young
James A. Jergenson

Results

General election

Results

References

Montana
1934
1934 Montana elections
Montana 1934
Montana Senate (Class II)
United States Senate 1934